"(We Ain't Got) Nothin' Yet" is a song by the American rock band Blues Magoos, released in October 1966. It was a chart hit in the United States in February 1967. It was written by Ron Gilbert, Ralph Scala and Mike Esposito. The Vox Continental organ riff, which also appeared in Liverpool Five's "She's Mine" (in the same year) was closely based on guitarist James Burton's riff to Ricky Nelson's 1962 rock recording of the old George Gershwin standard "Summertime", which also inspired Deep Purple's 1970 hit song "Black Night".

Charts

The Spectres version

"(We Ain't Got) Nothin' Yet" is a single released by the British Rock band The Spectres  (a predecessor of Status Quo) in 1967.

Track listing 
 "(We Ain't Got) Nothin' Yet" (Gilbert/Scala/Esposito) (2.18)
 "I Want It" (Lynes/Coghlan/Rossi/Lancaster) (3.01)

See also
 List of 1960s one-hit wonders in the United States

References

External links
 

1966 singles
1967 singles
1966 songs
Mercury Records singles
Piccadilly Records singles
Blues Magoos songs